Talal Al-Absi (born 22 February 1993) is a Saudi Arabian footballer who currently plays as a defender for Al-Ahli and the Saudi national team.

Career
Talal Al-Absi started his career at Al-Ittihad and made his debut on 14 April 2013 in the league match against Najran. He made his continental debut for Al-Ittihad in the Champions League group stage match against Iranian side Tractor which ended in a 1–0 loss.

On 17 July 2015, Al-Absi signed a two-year contract with Al-Taawoun. He made his debut for the club on 21 August 2015 against Al-Ahli. On 28 January 2016, he scored his first goal for the club in a 2–2 draw with Al-Ahli. He made 24 league appearances as he helped the club finish fourth and qualify for the Champions League for the first time in history. On 11 May 2017, Al-Absi extended his contract with the club, keeping him at the club until 2020. On 2 May 2019, Al-Absi captained Al-Taawoun in their first King Cup final against former club Al-Ittihad. He scored the equalizer in the 55th minute as Al-Taawoun won their first King Cup title. On 4 January 2020, Al-Absi missed a penalty in the penalty shoot-outs in the eventual loss against Al-Nassr in the 2019 Saudi Super Cup.

On 26 January 2020, Al-Absi signed a three-year contract with Al-Ahli. He will join the club following the conclusion of the 2019–20 season.

Career statistics

Club

Honours

Club
Al-Ittihad
 King Cup: 2013

Al-Taawoun
 King Cup: 2019

International
Saudi Arabia
 Arabian Gulf Cup:
 Runner-up: 2019

References

External links
 

1993 births
Living people
Sportspeople from Jeddah
Association football defenders
Saudi Arabian footballers
Saudi Arabia youth international footballers
Saudi Arabia international footballers
Ittihad FC players
Al-Taawoun FC players
Al-Ahli Saudi FC players
Saudi Professional League players
Saudi First Division League players